The 1946–47 Marshall Thundering Herd men's basketball team represented Marshall University in the 1946–47 college basketball season. They and were led by 12th year head coach Cam Henderson.  Marshall won the 1947 NAIA Division I men's basketball tournament National Championship held at Municipal Auditorium in Kansas City, Missouri. The 10th annual men's basketball tournament of what is now the National Association of Intercollegiate Athletics (NAIA) featured 32 teams playing in a single-elimination format.

Roster

References 

Marshall Thundering Herd men's basketball seasons
Marsh
Marsh
NAIA men's basketball tournament championship seasons